Märkisch Buchholz is a small town in the Dahme-Spreewald district, in Brandenburg, Germany. It is situated on the river Dahme, 20 km northwest of Lübben (Spreewald) and resp. 50 km southeast of Berlin.

Overview
The town is the smallest one in Brandenburg with town status. Founded in the 12th or 13th century the town's first historical mention dated on 13 August 1301, described as castrum et oppidum Buchholt. The town was heavily destroyed during the last day of World War II, due to strategic position at the Dahme river in Battle of Halbe. The federal highway B179 connect the town direct with Berlin.

Demography

See also
Köthener See

References

 

Localities in Dahme-Spreewald